The DownsSteam Tourist Railway & Museum was founded in 2001 in the Toowoomba suburb of Drayton in Queensland.

the station building on the complex was originally situated at Yuleba, between Roma and Miles servicing the town of Yuleba from 1879 to 2008. the building was purchased by the Museum after it was replaced by the present-day Yuleba Railway Station in 2008.

It proposes to operate overnight tours under the Great Divide Scenic Railway brand with former Lander carriages that were delivered in June 2015.

It has the following collection:
Queensland Railways locomotive 106 
Queensland Railways locomotive 1172
Queensland Railways locomotive 1177 (Used for parts on 1172, Scrapped)
Tasmanian Government Railways railcar DP13 (No longer at DS - 
7 SX carriages
M series carriages - MBSC 1486, MCS 1466, MAS 1494, MBC 1449, MBS 1483, MBL 1506 & MBLM 1526 (Rear of site, not on track), MCC 1503, MCD 1516,
2000 class rail motor "The Commissioner"

References

External links
DownsSteam Tourist Railway & Museum

Museums in Queensland
Railway museums in Queensland
Toowoomba
2001 establishments in Australia